The Class 425 and Class 426 EMUs are a class of electric multiple units built by a consortium of Siemens, Bombardier and DWA, and are operated by DB Regio in Germany. They are essentially the same vehicle design, but the Class 425 EMU consists of four carriages, whereas the Class 426 EMUs only have two carriages.It's produced in H0 scale to a few  train model railway.

Description
It is a high-powered, light-weight vehicle with high acceleration for short- and medium-distance services with frequent stops. The aluminium superstructure was built as flat as possible, both to minimize drag and to ease automated cleaning. The acceleration is achieved by distributing traction motors among eight of the train's ten axles including two of the three jacobs bogies.

It is based on the Class 423 design, but lacks a third set of doorways in the centre of each car.

See also
Express Rail Link, a Malaysian railway line which uses trains derived from the ET 425
NS Sprinter Lighttrain, a Dutch regional train derived from the ET 425

425
Articulated passenger trains
Bombardier Transportation multiple units
15 kV AC multiple units
Siemens multiple units
Rolling stock of Malaysia
25 kV AC multiple units
Multiple units of Malaysia